The People of Family (PdF), is a social conservative political party in Italy. Its leader and President is Mario Adinolfi, writer and director of La Croce newspaper and former member of the Democratic Party.

Ideology
The party was founded in March 2016 to establish a political representation to the people who had participated at the two "Family Day"s, the first one beheld in Piazza San Giovanni the 20th of June 2015 and the second one hosted in Circus Maximus in Rome the 30th of January 2016.

The People of the Family is a non-confessional and value-based political subject of Christian inspiration, focused on the Social Doctrine of the Catholic Church, open to non-believers and other religious confessions who share its program in defense of "non-negotiable" values: the right to life from conception to natural death, the centrality of the family as established by Article 29 of the Italian Constitution ("the family as the first natural community based on marriage") and children's right to have a father and a mother. The PdF also opposes same-sex couples' adoption rights.

The People of Family's values are mainly centered on the Christian faith, which built the historical and cultural identity of Italy and Europe, another fundamental value being represented by the family. According to PdF members, they are the heirs of the great tradition of the Italian People's Party of Don Luigi Sturzo.

The People of Family formed a joint list with Popular Alternative for the 2019 European Parliament election.

On the occasion of the 2022 general election, the PdF formed a political alliance with Exit, a party led by Simone Di Stefano (former leader of CasaPound), founding a joint electoral list named Alternative for Italy.

Controversies
The party was labeled by some political commentators as a Christian fundamentalist movement.

Secretaries
 Mario Adinolfi (2016-2017)
 Gianfranco Amato (2017-2020)
 Nicola Di Matteo (2020-in charge)

National Congress
 1° National Congress 6–7 June 2020, Pomezia (Province of Rome)

Electoral results

Italian Parliament

European Parliament

Symbols

References

External links
Official website
The People of Family Facebook

Political parties established in 2016
2016 establishments in Italy
Conservative parties in Italy
Social conservative parties
Catholic political parties
Christian democratic parties in Italy